Dănuţ Perjă (born 14 November 1974) is a former Romanian football defender.

Career
Perjă won three Romanian Cup and two Romanian Super Cup finals as a FC Rapid București player. After he retired from playing, he became a manager leading Rapid and FC Hermannstadt in Liga I.

Honours
Rapid București
 Divizia A: 2002–03
 Cupa României: 2001–02, 2005–06, 2006–07
 Supercupa României: 2002, 2003, 2007

References

External links
 
 
 

1974 births
Living people
Association football central defenders
People from Suceava County
Romanian footballers
Liga I players
Liga II players
Israeli Premier League players
CSM Ceahlăul Piatra Neamț players
FC Rapid București players
Beitar Jerusalem F.C. players
Romanian expatriate footballers
Expatriate footballers in Israel
Romanian expatriate sportspeople in Israel
Association football defenders